is a railway station in Nanae, Kameda District, Hokkaidō Prefecture, Japan.

Lines
Hokkaido Railway Company
Hakodate Main Line Station H69

Adjacent stations

Railway stations in Japan opened in 1943
Railway stations in Hokkaido Prefecture